Wei Wenhua (January 3, 1967 – January 7, 2008) was the general manager of a construction company, Shuli Architectural Engineering. He was beaten to death in Wanba, Tianmen, Hubei, after attempting to film Chinese authorities clashing with villagers.

Death
The conflict which Wei attempted to film centered on a garbage dump in the village that the Chinese government was using, which the village government feared to be threatening to the inhabitants' lives.

The Chinese media reported that Wei was beaten by a group of thirty or more Chengguan (urban management officers) when he attempted to photograph the villagers protesting (by attempting to prevent more garbage being dumped) with a mobile phone (it is not currently known what Wei was attempting to use the photographs for). He was beaten inside his car for five minutes and declared dead at a local hospital soon after.

Response to death
Qi Zhengjun, secretary-general of the city's government and commander of the municipal force, was fired from his position after the incident, following public outrage and government investigation into Wei's death. Twenty-four Chengguan members, as well as over one hundred other government personnel, were also questioned, and four people were detained.

According to Chen Junling, Wei's brother-in-law, a protest outside Tianmen's city hall the day after Wei's death comprised thousands of people.

See also
Internet censorship in the People's Republic of China
Politics of the People's Republic of China
Citizen journalism
Citizen media

References 

1967 births
2008 deaths
2008 in China
Victims of police brutality
People murdered in China
Chinese murder victims
Chinese business executives
Businesspeople in construction
Law enforcement in China
Deaths by beating
Scandals in China
History of Hubei